Samuel Young (1779, Lenox, Berkshire County, Massachusetts – November 3, 1850 Ballston, Saratoga County, New York) was an American lawyer and politician.

Life
In 1813, he was Moderator of the Board of Supervisors of Saratoga County.

He was a member of the New York State Assembly (Saratoga Co.) in 1814 and 1814–15; and was Speaker in 1814-15.

From 1816 to 1840, he was a member of the Erie Canal Commission.

He was a member of the New York State Senate (Eastern D.) from 1818 to 1821, sitting in the 41st, 42nd, 43rd and 44th New York State Legislatures. In 1819. he was the Bucktails candidate for U.S. Senator from New York, but due to a three-cornered contest with Clintonian John C. Spencer and Federalist Rufus King, no-one was elected. Young was a delegate to the New York State Constitutional Convention of 1821.

In 1824 he was the Bucktails candidate for Governor of New York, but lost to DeWitt Clinton. He was again a member of the State Assembly (Saratoga Co.) in 1826, and was Speaker. From 1833 to 1838, he was First Judge of the Saratoga County Court.

He was again a member of the State Senate (4th D.) from 1835 to 1836, sitting in the 58th and 59th New York State Legislatures. He issued a concurring opinion in Coster v. Lorillard that was remarkable for its attack on the common law.  He resigned his seat on May 22, 1836. In November of the same year he was re-elected to the State Senate and served from 1837 to 1840, sitting in the 60th, 61st, 62nd and 63rd New York State Legislatures.

He was Secretary of State of New York from 1842 to 1845. He was again a member of the State Senate (4th D.) from 1846 to 1847, sitting in the 69th and 70th New York State Legislatures.

He was Chairman of the Barnburners state convention which met on June 22, 1848, at Utica, New York and nominated Martin Van Buren for U.S. President.  He was a Democrat.

He was buried at Briggs Cemetery in Ballston Spa, New York.

Sources
 Political Graveyard
Jabez Delano Hammond: The History of Political Parties in the State of New York (Baltimore, 1850)
 History of Saratoga County by Nathaniel Bartlett Sylvester (1878)
The New York Civil List compiled by Franklin Benjamin Hough (pages 33, 42, 131, 147, 318 and 364; Weed, Parsons and Co., 1858)

References

|-

1779 births
1850 deaths
Speakers of the New York State Assembly
Erie Canal Commissioners
New York (state) state senators
Secretaries of State of New York (state)
People from Lenox, Massachusetts
People from Ballston Spa, New York
Burials in Saratoga County, New York